Nicole Maurey (20 December 1925 – 11 March 2016) was a French actress, who appeared in 65 film and television productions between 1945 and 1997.

Life and career
Born in Bois-Colombes, a northwestern suburb of Paris, Maurey was originally a dancer before being cast in her first film role in 1944. 

In 1953 Maurey appeared opposite Bing Crosby in Little Boy Lost that was filmed in France.  The following year Universal-International brought Nicole Maurey from France, Gia Scala from Italy and Myriam Verbeeck from Belgium to the United States to test for the role of Mary Magdelene in an unproduced Biblical epic The Galileans.   She remains most noted as Charlton Heston's leading lady in Secret of the Incas (1954), often cited as the primary inspiration for Raiders of the Lost Ark (1981). She starred in films with Alec Guinness, Bette Davis, Bing Crosby, Jeff Chandler, Fess Parker, Rex Harrison, Robert Taylor and Mickey Rooney, among numerous others. She was the leading lady in the original 1962 science fiction cult film The Day of the Triffids. Later in life, she moved into television, appearing in various made-for-TV movies and mini-series.

Personal life
She was married to Jacques Gallo.

Death
Maurey died in March 2016 at the age of 90.

Filmography

 The Black Cavalier (1945) as Solange
 Pamela (1945) as Mme Royale
 Blondine (1945) as Blondine
 La bataille du feu (1949) as Anne-Marie
 Diary of a Country Priest (1951) as Mlle Louise
 Rendezvous in Grenada (1951) Manina
 The Last Robin Hood (1953) as Isabelle Delorme
 Operation Magali (1953) as Manon
 Les Compagnes de la nuit (1953) as Yvonne Leriche
 L'oeil en coulisse (1953) as Annette Durand
 Little Boy Lost (1953) as Lisa Garret
 The Most Wanted Man (1953) as Peggy
 Royal Affairs in Versailles (1954) as Mademoiselle de Fontanges
 Secret of the Incas (1954) as Elena Antonescu
 Napoléon (1955) as Mme Tallien 
 The Constant Husband (1955) as Lola
 The Bold and the Brave (1956) as Fiamma
 The Weapon (1956) as Vivienne
 Section des disparus (1956) as Diana Lander
 Action immédiate (1957) as Diana Rossi
 Rogue's Yarn (1957) as Michele Cartier
 Me and the Colonel (1958) as Suzanne Roualet
 The Scapegoat (1959) as Bela
 The Jayhawkers! (1959) (aka Violence au Kansas) as Jeanne Dubois
 The House of the Seven Hawks (1959) as Constanta Sluiter
 High Time (1960) as Prof. Helene Gauthier
 His and Hers (1961) as Simone Rolfe
 Don't Bother to Knock (1961) as Lucille
 The Day of the Triffids (1963) as Christine Durrant
 The Very Edge (1963) as Helen
 Pleins feux sur Stanislas (1965) as Claire
 Sale temps pour les mouches (1966) as Eva Delagrange
 Gloria (1977) as Alice
 Chanel Solitaire (1981) as Grande Dame

Television

 The Ford Television Theatre (1955, Episode: "Tomorrow We'll Love") as Denise
 Casablanca (1955, Episode: "Black Market Operation") as Denise
 Avatar (1964, TV Movie)
 Rouletabille (1966, Episode: "Le parfum de la dame en noir") as Mathilde Stengerson
 La Morale de l'histoire (1966, TV Movie) as Thérèse
 Champion House (1967) as Michele Champion
 Noëlle aux quatre vents (1970) as Lisette Andrieux
 Mon seul amour (1971) as Claude
 La Demoiselle d'Avignon (1972, TV Movie) as Nicole
 Les Évasions célèbres (1972) as Mme de Boislinard
 Le grillon du foyer (1972, TV Movie) as Dot
 La vie et la passion de Dodin-Bouffant (1972, TV Movie) as Pauline
 Au théâtre ce soir (1972, Episode: "Histoire d'un détective") as Mary McLaren
 Les nuits de la colère (1973, TV Movie) as Louise
 Le provocateur (1973) as Gisèle Charmoy
 Une atroce petite musique (1973, TV Movie) as Irène Musselet
 Marie Dorval (1973, TV Movie) as Mademoiselle Mars
 Les écrivains (1973, TV Movie) as Eve
  (1973, TV Mini-Series) as Frau Grammont (uncredited)
 Lucien Leuwen (1973-1974, TV Mini-Series) as Mme Leuwen
 Au théâtre ce soir (1974, Episode: "Le procès de Mary Dugan") as Mme Rice
 La passagère (1974, TV Movie) as Catherine Caron
 Comme du bon pain (1976, TV Mini-Series) as Madeleine Rivard
 La lune papa (1977, TV Mini-Series) as Mme Marchandou
 La vie des autres (1980) as Blanche
 Sunday Night Thriller (1981, Episode: "I Thought They Died Years Ago") as Eliane Label
 Marianne, une étoile pour Napoléon (1983) as Princesse de Benevent
 Les Cinq Dernières Minutes (1983) as Gertrude Necken
 Rouge Marine (1983) as Gertrude Necken
 Coulisses (1986) as Sabine Corval

Theatre
 1952: Harvey by Mary Chase, director Marcel Achard, Théâtre Antoine
 1964: La Preuve par quatre written and directed by Félicien Marceau, Théâtre de la Michodière

References

External links

 
 
 The Private Life and Times of Nicole Maurey

1925 births
2016 deaths
People from Bois-Colombes
French film actresses
French television actresses
French female dancers
20th-century French actresses
French National Academy of Dramatic Arts alumni
French expatriate actresses in the United States